Lea Yanitsas (born 15 March 1989) is a water polo player of Australia. She was part of the Australian team at the 2015, 2017 and 2019 World Aquatics Championships.

Yanitsas was a member of the Australian Stingrays squad that competed at the Tokyo 2020 Olympics. The Head Coach was Predrag Mihailović. By finishing second in their pool, the Aussie Stingers went through to the quarterfinals. They were beaten 8-9 by Russia and therefore did not compete for an Olympic medal. Australia at the 2020 Summer Olympics details the team's performance in depth.

Career
 Member of the Stingers
 Senior Debut 2007
 Silver medal in 2010 World Cup in Christchurch
 World Championships Barcelona 2013, Kazan 2015,
 Co Captain of Sydney Uni National League Champions 2016
 Named in the 2016 Rio Stingers team

See also
 Australia women's Olympic water polo team records and statistics
 List of women's Olympic water polo tournament goalkeepers
 List of World Aquatics Championships medalists in water polo

References

External links
 

1989 births
Living people
Place of birth missing (living people)
Australian female water polo players
Water polo goalkeepers
Olympic water polo players of Australia
Water polo players at the 2016 Summer Olympics
World Aquatics Championships medalists in water polo
Water polo players at the 2020 Summer Olympics
21st-century Australian women